Paragomphus bredoi is a species of dragonfly in the family Gomphidae. It is found in the Democratic Republic of the Congo, Malawi, and possibly Uganda. Its natural habitat is subtropical or tropical moist lowland forests. Although its status is of "Least Concern", it is still threatened by habitat destruction.

References

Gomphidae
Insects described in 1934
Insects of the Democratic Republic of the Congo
Insects of Malawi
Taxonomy articles created by Polbot